The 2021–22 Denver Nuggets season was the 46th season of the franchise in the National Basketball Association (NBA), and the franchise's 55th season of existence overall. The Nuggets entered the season after a second-round loss at the hands of the eventual Western Conference champion Phoenix Suns. They finished the season 48–34, but lost to the eventual champion Golden State Warriors in five games in the first round. The two teams previously met in the first round of the 2013 playoffs in which the Warriors defeated the Nuggets in six games. Nikola Jokić was awarded the NBA MVP Award for the second consecutive season.

Draft
 

The Nuggets owned one first-round pick in the draft, having their second round pick traded to the Oklahoma City Thunder via the Philadelphia 76ers and Golden State Warriors.

Roster

Standings

Division

Conference

Game log

Preseason

|-style="background:#fcc;"
| 1
| October 4
| @ L.A. Clippers
| 
| Michael Porter Jr. (23)
| JaMychal Green (8)
| Monté Morris (6)
| Staples Center7,825
| 0–1
|-style="background:#fcc;"
| 2
| October 6
| @ Golden State
| 
| Nikola Jokić (17)
| Nikola Jokić (10)
| Nah'Shon Hyland (6)
| Chase Center16,923
| 0–2
|-style="background:#fcc;"
| 3
| October 8
| Minnesota
| 
| Nah'Shon Hyland (21)
| Nikola Jokić (9)
| Nikola Jokić (10)
| Ball Arena11,927
| 0–3
|-style="background:#fcc;"
| 3
| October 13
| @ Oklahoma City
| 
| Nikola Jokić (22)
| Nikola Jokić (12)
| Campazzo, Jokić (5)
| Paycom CenterN/A
| 0–4
|-style="background:#cfc;"
| 4
| October 14
| @ Oklahoma City
| 
| Markus Howard (31)
| Bol Bol (12)
| Nah'Shon Hyland (7)
| Paycom CenterN/A
| 1–4

Regular season

|-style="background:#cfc;"
| 1
| October 20
| @ Phoenix
| 
| Nikola Jokić (27)
| Nikola Jokić (13)
| Barton, Porter Jr. (5)
| Footprint Center16,074
| 1–0
|-style="background:#cfc;"
| 2
| October 22
| San Antonio
| 
| Nikola Jokić (32)
| Nikola Jokić (16)
| Nikola Jokić (7)
| Ball Arena19,520
| 2–0
|-style="background:#fcc;"
| 3
| October 25
| Cleveland
| 
| Nikola Jokić (24)
| Nikola Jokić (19)
| Monté Morris (6)
| Ball Arena14,221
| 2–1
|-style="background:#fcc;"
| 4
| October 26
| @ Utah
|  
| Nikola Jokić (24)
| Michael Porter Jr. (9)
| Nikola Jokić (6)
| Vivint Arena18,306
| 2–2
|-style="background:#cfc;"
| 5
| October 29
| Dallas
| 
| Will Barton (17)
| Nikola Jokić (16)
| Nikola Jokić (8)
| Ball Arena18,315
| 3–2
|-style="background:#cfc;"
| 6
| October 30
| @ Minnesota
| 
| Nikola Jokić (26)
| Nikola Jokić (19)
| Nikola Jokić (7)
| Target Center17,136
| 4–2

|-style="background:#fcc;"
| 7
| November 1
| @ Memphis
| 
| Nikola Jokić (23)
| Aaron Gordon (10)
| Nikola Jokić (7)
| FedExForum12,683
| 4–3
|-style="background:#fcc;"
| 8
| November 3
| @ Memphis
| 
| Nikola Jokić (34)
| Jokić, Porter Jr. (11)
| Will Barton (7)
| FedExForum12,977
| 4–4
|-style="background:#cfc;"
| 9
| November 6
| Houston
| 
| Nikola Jokić (28)
| Nikola Jokić (14)
| Will Barton (6)
| Ball Arena16,046
| 5–4
|-style="background:#cfc;"
| 10
| November 8
| Miami
| 
| Barton, Jokić (25)
| Nikola Jokić (15)
| Nikola Jokić (10)
| Ball Arena15,577
| 6–4
|-style="background:#cfc;"
| 11
| November 10
| Indiana
| 
| Will Barton (30)
| Aaron Gordon (9)
| Hyland, Morris (4)
| Ball Arena15,232
| 7–4
|-style="background:#cfc;"
| 12
| November 12
| Atlanta
| 
| Aaron Gordon (23)
| Nikola Jokić (19)
| Nikola Jokić (10)
| Ball Arena16,849
| 8–4
|-style="background:#cfc;"
| 13
| November 14
| Portland
| 
| Nikola Jokić (28)
| Zeke Nnaji (10)
| Nikola Jokić (9)
| Ball Arena14,583
| 9–4
|-style="background:#fcc;"
| 14
| November 15
| @ Dallas
| 
| Nikola Jokić (35)
| Nikola Jokić (16)
| Monté Morris (8)
| American Airlines Center19,797
| 9–5
|-style="background:#fcc;"
| 15
| November 18
| Philadelphia
| 
| Nikola Jokić (30)
| Nikola Jokić (10)
| Will Barton (8)
| Ball Arena14,547
| 9–6
|-style="background:#fcc;"
| 16
| November 19
| Chicago
| 
| Aaron Gordon (28)
| P.J. Dozier (10)
| Monté Morris (5) 
| Ball Arena19,520
| 9–7
|-style="background:#fcc;"
| 17
| November 21
| @ Phoenix
| 
| Jeff Green (19)
| Aaron Gordon (10)
| Gordon, Ja. Green (4)
| Footprint Center16,072
| 9–8
|-style="background:#fcc;"
| 18
| November 23
| @ Portland
| 
| Jeff Green (24)
| Will Barton (8)
| Will Barton (7)
| Moda Center17,052
| 9–9
|-style="background:#fcc;"
| 19
| November 26
| Milwaukee
| 
| Aaron Gordon (18)
| Barton, Gordon (9)
| Monté Morris (8)
| Ball Arena19,520
| 9–10
|-style="background:#cfc;"
| 20
| November 29
| @ Miami
| 
| Nikola Jokić (24)
| Nikola Jokić (15)
| Nikola Jokić (7)
| FTX Arena19,600
| 10–10

|-style="background:#fcc;"
| 21
| December 1
| @ Orlando
| 
| Monté Morris (22)
| Nikola Jokić (15)
| Nikola Jokić (7)
| Amway Center14,191
| 10–11
|-style="background:#cfc;"
| 22
| December 4
| @ New York
| 
| Nikola Jokić (32)
| Nikola Jokić (11)
| Will Barton (6)
| Madison Square Garden18,272
| 11–11
|-style="background:#fcc;"
| 23
| December 6
| @ Chicago
| 
| Barton, Morris (19)
| Jeff Green (13)
| Nikola Jokić (15)
| United Center21,236
| 11–12
|-style="background:#cfc;"
| 24
| December 8
| @ New Orleans
| 
| Nikola Jokić (39)
| Nikola Jokić (11)
| Nikola Jokić (11)
| Smoothie King Center15,035
|  12–12
|-style="background:#fcc;"
| 25
| December 9
| @ San Antonio
| 
| Aaron Gordon (25)
| Nikola Jokić (13)
| Nikola Jokić (10)
| AT&T Center12,855
| 12–13
|-style="background:#cfc;"
| 26
| December 11
| @ San Antonio
| 
| Nikola Jokić (35)
| Nikola Jokić (17)
| Campazzo, Jokić (8)
| AT&T Center14,607
| 13–13
|-style="background:#cfc;"
| 27
| December 13
| Washington
| 
| Nikola Jokić (28)
| Nikola Jokić (19)
| Nikola Jokić (9)
| Ball Arena14,632
| 14–13
|-style="background:#fcc;"
| 28
| December 15
| Minnesota
| 
| Nikola Jokić (27)
| Nikola Jokić (10)
| Nikola Jokić (11)
| Ball Arena15,365
| 14–14
|-style="background:#cfc;"
| 29
| December 17
| @ Atlanta
| 
| Nah'Shon Hyland (24)
| Nikola Jokić (10)
| Facundo Campazzo (8)
| State Farm Arena16,114
| 15–14
|- style="background:#bbb;"
| —
| December 19
| @ Brooklyn
| colspan="6"|Postponed due to COVID-19 pandemic
|-style="background:#fcc;"
| 30
| December 22
| @ Oklahoma City
|  
| Nikola Jokić (13)
| Ja. Green, Jokić (7) 
| Facundo Campazzo (6)
| Paycom Center14,932
| 15–15
|-style="background:#fcc;"
| 31
| December 23
| Charlotte
| 
| Nikola Jokić (29)
| Nikola Jokić (21)
| Campazzo, Jokić (5)
| Ball Arena17,003
| 15–16
|-style="background:#cfc;"
| 32
| December 26
| @ L. A. Clippers
| 
| Nikola Jokić (26)
| Nikola Jokić (22)
| Nikola Jokić (8)
| Crypto.com Arena17,759
| 16–16
|-style="background:#cfc;"
| 33
| December 28
| @ Golden State
| 
| Nikola Jokić (22)
| Nikola Jokić (19)
| Facundo Campazzo (7)
| Chase Center18,064
| 17–16
|-style="background:#bbb;"
| —
| December 30
| Golden State
| colspan="6"|Postponed due to COVID-19 pandemic
|-style="background:#fcc;"

|-style="background:#cfc;"
| 34
| 1 January
| @ Houston
| 
| Nikola Jokić (24)
| Nikola Jokić (11)
| Facundo Campazzo (12)
| Toyota Center18,055
| 18–16
|-style="background:#fcc;"
| 35
| 3 January
| @ Dallas
| 
| Nikola Jokić (27)
| Nikola Jokić (16)
| Will Barton (6)
| American Airlines Center19,767
| 18–17
|-style="background:#fcc;"
| 36
| 5 January
| Utah
| 
| Nikola Jokić (26)
| Nikola Jokić (21)
| Nikola Jokić (11)
| Ball Arena14,056
| 18–18
|-style="background:#cfc;"
| 37
| 7 January
| Sacramento
| 
| Nikola Jokić (33)
| Nikola Jokić (10)
| Campazzo, Jokić (7)
| Ball Arena15,966
| 19–18
|-style="background:#cfc;"
| 38
| 9 January
| @ Oklahoma City
| 
| Jokić, Rivers (22)
| Nikola Jokić (18)
| Facundo Campazzo (8)
| Paycom Center14,772
| 20–18
|-style="background:#fcc;"
| 39
| 11 January
| @ L. A. Clippers
| 
| Aaron Gordon (30)
| Nikola Jokić (13)
| Nikola Jokić (8)
| Crypto.com Arena15,077
| 20–19
|-style="background:#cfc;"
| 40
| 13 January
| Portland
| 
| Will Barton (21)
| Zeke Nnaji (9)
| Facundo Campazzo (12)
| Ball Arena14,972
| 21–19
|-style="background:#cfc;"
| 41
| 15 January
| L. A. Lakers
| 
| Nah'Shon Hyland (27)
| Nikola Jokić (12)
| Nikola Jokić (13)
| Ball Arena19,520
| 22–19
|-style="background:#fcc;"
| 42
| 16 January
| Utah
| 
| Nikola Jokić (25)
| Nikola Jokić (15)
| Nikola Jokić (14)
| Ball Arena15,647
| 22–20
|-style="background:#cfc;"
| 43
| 19 January
| L. A. Clippers
| 
| Nikola Jokić (49)
| Nikola Jokić (14)
| Nikola Jokić (10)
| Ball Arena14,547
| 23–20
|-style="background:#fcc;"
| 44
| 21 January
| Memphis
| 
| Will Barton (27)
| Nikola Jokić (11)
| Nikola Jokić (12)
| Ball Arena17,009
| 23–21
|-style="background:#cfc;'
| 45
| 23 January
| Detroit
| 
| Nikola Jokić (34)
| Nikola Jokić (9)
| Nikola Jokić (8)
| Ball Arena14,060
| 24–21
|-style="background:#cfc;'
| 46
| 25 January
| @ Detroit
| 
| Nikola Jokić (28)
| Nikola Jokić (21)
| Nikola Jokić (9)
| Little Caesars Arena16,023
| 25–21
|-style="background:#cfc;'
| 47
| 26 January
| @ Brooklyn
| 
| Nikola Jokić (26)
| Barton, Jokić (10)
| Nikola Jokić (8)
| Barclays Center18,011
| 26–21
|-style="background:#cfc;'
| 48
| 28 January
| @ New Orleans
| 
| Nikola Jokić (29)
| Nikola Jokić (13)
| Nikola Jokić (10)
| Smoothie King Center15,254
| 27–21
|-style="background:#cfc;'
| 49
| 30 January
| @ Milwaukee
| 
| Aaron Gordon (24)
| Nikola Jokić (9)
| Nikola Jokić (15)
| Fiserv Forum17,341
| 28–21

|-style="background:#fcc;'
| 50
| 1 February
| @ Minnesota
| 
| Nikola Jokić (21)
| Nikola Jokić (16)
| Nikola Jokić (8)
| Target Center15,839
| 28–22
|-style="background:#fcc;'
| 51
| 2 February
| @ Utah
| 
| Bryn Forbes (26)
| Will Barton (9)
| Nah'Shon Hyland (7)
| Vivint Arena18,306
| 28–23
|-style="background:#fcc;'
| 52
| 4 February
| New Orleans
| 
| Nikola Jokić (25)
| Nikola Jokić (12)
| Nikola Jokić (9)
| Ball Arena16,152
| 28–24
|-style="background:#cfc;'
| 53
| 6 February
| Brooklyn
| 
| Nikola Jokić (27)
| Nikola Jokić (12)
| Nikola Jokić (10)
| Ball Arena18,241
| 29–24
|-style="background:#cfc;'
| 54
| 8 February
| New York
| 
| Nah'Shon Hyland (22)
| Nikola Jokić (11)
| Nikola Jokić (7)
| Ball Arena15,093
| 30–24
|-style="background:#fcc;'
| 55
| 11 February
| @ Boston
| 
| Nikola Jokić (23)
| Nikola Jokić (16)
| Nikola Jokić (11)
| TD Garden19,156
| 30–25
|-style="background:#cfc;'
| 56
| 12 February
| @ Toronto
| 
| Nikola Jokić (28)
| Nikola Jokić (15)
| Nikola Jokić (6)
| Scotiabank Arena0
| 31–25
|-style="background:#cfc;'
| 57
| 14 February
| Orlando
| 
| Nikola Jokić (26)
| Nikola Jokić (15)
| Nikola Jokić (7)
| Ball Arena15,025
| 32–25
|-style="background:#cfc;'
| 58
| 16 February
| @ Golden State
| 
| Nikola Jokić (35)
| Nikola Jokić (17)
| Nikola Jokić (8)
| Chase Center18,064
| 33–25
|- align="center"
|colspan="9" bgcolor="#bbcaff"|All-Star Break
|-style="background:#cfc;'
| 59
| 24 February
| @ Sacramento
| 
| Will Barton (31)
| Nikola Jokić (12)
| Nikola Jokić (9) 
| Golden 1 Center15,855
| 34–25
|-style="background:#cfc;'
| 60
| 26 February
| Sacramento
| 
| Aaron Gordon (23)
| Nikola Jokić (10)
| Nikola Jokić (11)
| Ball Arena19,520
| 35–25
|-style="background:#cfc;'
| 61
| 27 February
| @ Portland
| 
| JaMychal Green (20)
| Nikola Jokić (18)
| Nikola Jokić (11)
| Moda Center17,771
| 36–25

|-style="background:#fcc;'
| 62
| 2 March
| Oklahoma City
| 
| Nikola Jokić (22)
| Nikola Jokić (16)
| Will Barton (5)
| Ball Arena15,167
| 36–26
|-style="background:#cfc;'
| 63
| 4 March
| Houston
| 
| DeMarcus Cousins (31)
| Cousins, Ja. Green (9)
| Nah'Shon Hyland (5)
| Ball Arena16,254
| 37–26
|-style="background:#cfc;'
| 64
| 6 March
| New Orleans
| 
| Nikola Jokić (46)
| Nikola Jokić (12)
| Nikola Jokić (11)
| Ball Arena14,962
| 38–26
|-style="background:#cfc;'
| 65
| 7 March
| Golden State
| 
| Nikola Jokić (32)
| Nikola Jokić (15)
| Nikola Jokić (13)
| Ball Arena19,542
| 39–26
|-style="background:#cfc;'
| 66
| 9 March
| @ Sacramento
| 
| Nikola Jokić (38)
| Nikola Jokić (18)
| Nikola Jokić (7)
| Golden 1 Center14,697
| 40–26
|-style="background:#fcc;'
| 67
| 10 March
| Golden State
| 
| Nikola Jokić (23)
| Nikola Jokić (12)
| Nikola Jokić (9)
| Ball Arena19,520
| 40–27
|-style="background:#fcc;'
| 68
| 12 March
| Toronto
| 
| Nikola Jokić (26)
| Nikola Jokić (10)
| Hyland, Jokić (7)
| Ball Arena18,659
| 40–28
|-style="background:#cfc;"
| 69
| 14 March
| @ Philadelphia
| 
| Nikola Jokić (22)
| Nikola Jokić (13)
| Nikola Jokić (8)
| Wells Fargo Center21,444
| 41–28
|-style="background:#cfc;"
| 70
| 16 March
| @ Washington
| 
| Nikola Jokić (29)
| Nikola Jokić (13)
| Nikola Jokić (8)
| Capital One Arena15,326
| 42–28
|-style="background:#fcc;"
| 71
| 18 March
| @ Cleveland
| 
| Nikola Jokić (32)
| Nikola Jokić (10)
| Nikola Jokić (8)
| Rocket Mortgage FieldHouse19,432
| 42–29
|-style="background:#fcc;"
| 72
| 20 March
| Boston
| 
| Nikola Jokić (23)
| Nikola Jokić (8)
| Hyland, Jokić, Morris, Rivers (4)
| Ball Arena19,602
| 42–30
|-style="background:#cfc;"
| 73
| 22 March
| L. A. Clippers
| 
| Nikola Jokić (30)
| Nikola Jokić (14)
| Gordon, Jokić (6)
| Ball Arena18,089
| 43–30
|-style="background:#fcc;"
| 74
| 24 March
| Phoenix
| 
| Nikola Jokić (28)
| Cousins, Gordon, Ja. Green Jokić (6)
| Will Barton (8)
| Ball Arena19,520
| 43–31
|-style="background:#cfc;"
| 75
| 26 March
| Oklahoma City
| 
| Nikola Jokić (35)
| Nikola Jokić (12)
| Nikola Jokić (8)
| Ball Arena19,520
| 44–31
|-style="background:#cfc;"
| 76
| 28 March
| @ Charlotte
| 
| Nikola Jokić (26)
| Nikola Jokić (19)
| Nikola Jokić (11)
| Spectrum Center17,614
| 45–31
|-style="background:#cfc;"
| 77
| 30 March
| @ Indiana
| 
| Nikola Jokić (37)
| Nikola Jokić (13)
| Nikola Jokić (9)
| Gainbridge Fieldhouse15,036
| 46–31

|-style="background:#fcc;"
| 78
| 1 April
| Minnesota
| 
| Nikola Jokić (38)
| Nikola Jokić (19)
| Nikola Jokić (8)
| Ball Arena19,612
| 46–32
|-style="background:#cfc;"
| 79
| 3 April
| @ L. A. Lakers
| 
| Nikola Jokić (38)
| Nikola Jokić (18)
| Monté Morris (10)
| Crypto.com Arena16,273
| 47–32
|-style="background:#fcc;"
| 80
| 5 April
| San Antonio
| 
| Nikola Jokić (41)
| Nikola Jokić (17)
| Will Barton (6)
| Ball Arena17,037
| 47–33
|-style="background:#cfc;"
| 81
| 7 April
| Memphis
| 
| Nikola Jokić (35)
| Nikola Jokić (16)
| Nah'Shon Hyland (7)
| Ball Arena19,520
| 48–33
|-style="background:#fcc;"
| 82
| 9 April
| L. A. Lakers
| 
| Markus Howard (25)
| Cousins & Ja. Green (9)
| Nah'Shon Hyland (6)
| Ball Arena19,520
| 48–34

Playoffs

|- style="background:#fcc
| 1
| April 16
| @ Golden State
| 
| Nikola Jokić (25)
| Nikola Jokić (10)
| Jokić, Morris 6
| Chase Center18,064
| 0–1
|- style="background:#fcc
| 2
| April 18
| @ Golden State
| 
| Nikola Jokić (26)
| Nikola Jokić (11)
| Nikola Jokić (4)
| Chase Center18,064
| 0–2
|- style="background:#fcc
| 3
| April 21
| Golden State 
| 
| Nikola Jokić (37)
| Nikola Jokić (18)
| Monte Morris (6)
| Ball Arena19,627
| 0–3
|- style="background:#cfc
| 4
| April 24
| Golden State 
| 
| Nikola Jokić (37)
| Nikola Jokić (8)
| Bones Hyland (7)
| Ball Arena19,628
| 1–3
|- style="background:#fcc
| 5
| April 27
| @ Golden State 
| 
| Nikola Jokić (30)
| Nikola Jokić (19)
| Nikola Jokić (8)
| Chase Center18,064
| 1–4

Player statistics

Regular season

|- align="center" bgcolor=""
| 
| 71 || 71 || 32.1 || .438 || .365 || .803 || 4.8 || 3.9 || .8 || .4 || 14.7
|- align="center" bgcolor=""
| 
| 14 || 0 || 5.8 || .556 || .250 || .400 || 1.4 || .4 || .1 || .1 || 2.4
|- align="center" bgcolor=""
| 
| 65 || 4 || 18.2 || .361 || .301 || .769 || 1.8 || 3.4 || 1.0 || .4 || 5.1
|- align="center" bgcolor=""
| 
| 15 || 1 || 11.7 || .561 || .583 || .643 || 2.1 || 1.1 || .1 || .2 || 4.1
|- align="center" bgcolor=""
| 
| 13 || 0 || 2.9 || .333 || .125 || .750 || 1.1 || .2 || .1 || .1 || 1.1
|- align="center" bgcolor=""
| 
| 31 || 2 || 13.9 || .456 || .324 || .736 || 5.5 || 1.7 || .6 || .4 || 8.9
|- align="center" bgcolor=""
| 
| 18 || 0 || 18.9 || .364 || .313 || .769 || 3.5 || 1.6 || .6 || .3 || 5.4
|- align="center" bgcolor=""
| 
| 3 || 0 || 4.7 || .333 || .000 || .000 || .7 || 1.0 || .0 || .0 || 1.3
|- align="center" bgcolor=""
| 
| 35 || 1 || 17.4 || .424 || .410 || .921 || .9 || 1.0 || .2 || .1 || 8.6
|- align="center" bgcolor=""
| 
| 75 || 75 || 31.7 || .520 || .335 || .743 || 5.9 || 2.5 || .6 || .6 || 15.0
|- align="center" bgcolor=""
| 
| 67 || 8 || 16.2 || .486 || .266 || .871 || 4.2 || .9 || .6 || .4 || 6.4
|- align="center" bgcolor=""
| 
| 75 || 63 || 24.7 || .524 || .315 || .833 || 3.1 || 1.3 || .4 || .4 || 10.3
|- align="center" bgcolor=""
| 
| 31 || 0 || 5.7 || .386 || .400 || .870 || .4 || .2 || .3 || .0 || 4.1
|- align="center" bgcolor=""
| 
| 69 || 4 || 19.0 || .403 || .366 || .856 || 2.7 || 2.8 || .6 || .3 || 10.1
|- align="center" bgcolor=""
| 
| 74 || 74 || 33.5 || .583 || .337 || .810 || 13.8 || 7.9 || 1.5 || .9 || 27.1
|- align="center" bgcolor=""
| 
| 2 || 0 || 2.0 || .500 || .000 || .000 || .0 || .0 || .0 || .0 || 1.0
|- align="center" bgcolor=""
| 
| 75 || 74 || 29.9 || .484 || .395 || .869 || 3.0 || 4.4 || .7 || .2 || 12.6
|- align="center" bgcolor=""
| 
| 41 || 1 || 17.0 || .516 || .463 || .631 || 3.6 || .4 || .4 || .3 || 6.6
|- align="center" bgcolor=""
| 
| 9 || 9 || 29.4 || .359 || .208 || .556 || 6.6 || 1.9 || 1.1 || .2 || 9.9
|- align="center" bgcolor=""
| 
| 48 || 5 || 13.9 || .503 || .430 || .667 || 2.3 || 1.1 || .5 || .2 || 4.4
|- align="center" bgcolor=""
| 
| 67 || 18 || 22.1 || .417 || .342 || .727 || 1.7 || 1.3 || .8 || .1 || 6.0
|- align="center" bgcolor=""
| 
| 3 || 0 || 9.7 || .500 || .000 || .750 || 1.3 || 1.3 || .3 || .0 || 2.0
|}

Playoffs

|- align="center" bgcolor=""
| 
| 5 || 5 || 34.4 || .409 || .393 || .667 || 5.6 || 2.8 || .8 || .2 || 13.8
|- align="center" bgcolor=""
| 
| 4 || 0 || 3.3 || .000 || .000 || .000 || .8 || .5 || .0 || .0 || .0
|- align="center" bgcolor=""
| 
| 2 || 0 || 4.5 || .667 || .500 || .000 || 1.0 || .5 || .0 || .0 || 2.5
|- align="center" bgcolor=""
| 
| 5 || 0 || 11.4 || .655 || .667 || .733 || 3.4 || 1.2 || .6 || .2 || 10.6
|- align="center" bgcolor=""
| 
| 5 || 0 || 15.2 || .400 || .364 || .800 || .6 || 1.4 || .2 || .0 || 4.0
|- align="center" bgcolor=""
| 
| 5 || 5 || 32.0 || .426 || .200 || .714 || 7.2 || 2.6 || .4 || 1.2 || 13.8
|- align="center" bgcolor=""
| 
| 5 || 0 || 13.8 || .375 || .200 || 1.000 || 2.4 || .4 || .0 || .2 || 4.0
|- align="center" bgcolor=""
| 
| 5 || 5 || 22.6 || .353 || .375 || .800 || 3.6 || .4 || .6 || .4 || 3.8
|- align="center" bgcolor=""
| 
| 5 || 0 || 17.4 || .361 || .348 || .857 || 2.0 || 3.2 || .2 || .0 || 9.2
|- align="center" bgcolor=""
| 
| 5 || 5 || 34.2 || .575 || .278 || .848 || 13.2 || 5.8 || 1.6 || 1.0 || 31.0
|- align="center" bgcolor=""
| 
| 5 || 5 || 31.2 || .490 || .423 || .750 || 2.2 || 5.4 || 1.2 || .0 || 14.0
|- align="center" bgcolor=""
| 
| 2 || 0 || 4.5 || 1.000 || 1.000 || .000 || .0 || .0 || .0 || .0 || 1.5
|- align="center" bgcolor=""
| 
| 5 || 0 || 21.6 || .444 || .333 || 1.000 || .6 || 1.2 || 1.4 || .2 || 4.2
|}

Transactions

Overview

Trades

Failed Bol Bol trade
On 10 January 2022, the Nuggets attempted to trade Bol Bol and draft compensation to the Detroit Pistons for Rodney McGruder. The trade unraveled three days later, however, as Bol failed his physical examination. Thereafter, the transaction was voided; Bol and McGruder stayed with their respective teams. On 19 January, the Nuggets traded Bol again (along with PJ Dozier), this time to the Boston Celtics, as part of a three-team deal.

Free agency

Re-signed

Additions

Subtractions

Notes

References

Denver Nuggets seasons
Denver Nuggets
Denver Nuggets
Denver Nuggets